Sergine Andre (‘Djinn’), born in the Artibonite region of Haiti, is an artist who has lived and worked in Brussels since 2010. Her work draws from the magical tradition of her home region and is situated within the country's abstract expressionist avant-garde.

Biography 

Following technical art training at the Ottawa School of Art in 1997, she won a prize with the Institute Francaise and the opportunity to work at the National School of Fine Arts in Paris as a guest artist.  In 2006, she participated at the Johannesburg Bag Factory in South Africa (as guest artist) and in 2011 at the 54th Venice Art Biennale.

In her art, Sergine draws heavily from childhood, living deep in the countryside of the Artibonite region of Haiti.  This was a rural world where there was little electricity, ties to the land were intimate, nature was omnipresent and the rustling of trees or the vivid night skies evoked a spirit world, simultaneously both troubling and serene.  Her art conveys those otherworldly feelings and sensations which others do not easily perceive.

Recurring themes are the invisible (those who pass through life but are unseen) restlessness, the afterlife and the joy of living. Her work is also powerfully informed by a searching curiosity and continuous exploration of the world in which we live.

Her work has been exhibited in North America (including New York, Miami, Pittsburgh, Montreal and Washington DC), the Caribbean (Haiti, Martinique, Dominican Republic), various cities in Europe (including Paris, Berlin, Venice, Brussels, Lyon, Luxembourg) as well as in Johannesbourg, South Africa.

Exhibitions 

 2022: World Atlantic Fair 2022, Galerie Monnin
 2022: 'Vives' Collective exhibition, Maison Dufort, Centre d'Art and the Museum of Haitian Art, Port-au-Princes, Haiti
 2021 :'Rara' Solo exhibition, Centre for Fine Arts, Brussels (BOZAR), in association with Camarote, Belgium
 2021: World Atlantic Fair 2021, Galerie Monnin
 2020 : Solo exhibition, Balthasar Brussels, Belgium
 2020 : "Les Rencontres Transfrontalières Francophones".  Solo exhibition, Hôtel de Ville de Saint-Louis, France
 2020 : "Map Danse Anba Lapli", collective exhibition. Galerie de la Rage. Lyon, and Studio Bossiere, Montreuil Paris, France
 2019 : "L’amitié dans la Diversité d’Horizon et de Culture II", curator of collective exhibition.  Private show, Brussels, Belgium
 2019 :  "Commemoration de la Bataille de Vertières", Embassy of Haiti to the Benelux countries, Brussels, Belgium
 2019 : ″Exposicion Colectiva:  Celebracion para Maryse Conde″ (curated by Delia Blanco) Embajada de Francia, Santo Domingo, Republica Dominicana
 2017 : « L’amitié dans la diversité d’horizon et de culture », Ateliers Mommen, Brussels, Belgium
 2015 : « Célébration des mondes sensibles, 141 ans de la cité », Ateliers Mommen, Brussels, Belgium
 2014 : « Regards sur la peinture haïtienne », Abbaye de Neumünster, Luxembourg, Grand Duchy of Luxembourg
 2013 : « Haiti Royaume de ce monde », Institut Français, Jacmel, Haïti
 2012 : « Haiti, un futur pour son passé », Palais des beaux-arts de Liège, Liège Belgium
 2012 : Centre Culturel de Rencontre Fonds Saint-Jacques, Martinique
 2011 : Global Caribbean III, Art Basel, Miami, United States
 2011: 6th Annual Haitian Art Exhibit, Casa de Campo, Dominican Republic
 2011: 54th Venice Biennale, Haiti Pavillion, Venice, Italy
 2011: Galerie 16, Yverdon-les-Bains, Switzerland
 2011: "Haïti Royaume de ce Monde", agnès b., Paris, France
 2011: "Haïti l'art contre l'oubli", Centre Culturel du Lièvre d'Or, Dreux, France
 2010: 'The Truth', collective exhibition, (collaboration with Galerie Monnin and Donna Karen), Stephan Weiss Studios, West Village, New York City
 2010: "Femmes en mythologie, mythologie de femmes", Musée du Montparnasse, Paris, France
 2009: "Make Art like Voodoo", Patchworldverlag, Berlin, Germany
 2009: "Dialogue 1: Haïti Art Now", Santo Domingo, Dominican Republic
 2009: Galerie 16, Yverdon-les-Bains, Switzerland
 2009: "Courant chaud", Musée du Panthéon National Haïtien, Port-au-Prince, Haiti
 2008: "Cultur'Elle" Institut français, Port-au-Prince, Haiti
 2007: Private Show, Casa de Campo, Republica Dominicana
 2007: Private Show, Residence of US Amassador to Haiti, Washington DC, United States
 2006: Bag Factory Artists Studio (guest artist), Johannesburg, South Africa
 2006: "Méandres de la mémoire", Salle Tohu, Montreal, Canada
 2005: "Haitian Experience", Absolute Americana Art Gallery, St. Augustine, Florida, United States
 2004: "Kafou" Institut français, Port-au-Prince, Haiti
 2004: "Femmes en production II", Port-au-Prince, Haiti
 2004: FONDAM, Haitian art sale and celebration, Washington DC, United States
 2004: "Three Women Show", Galerie Monnin, Pétion-Ville, Haiti
 2003: Atelier Eko, Pétion-Ville, Haiti
 2003: Alliance Française, Jacmel, Haiti
 2002: "Haitian art show", Friends of Hôpital Albert Schweitzer Haiti, Pittsburgh, Pennsylvania, United States
 2002: "Haitian Art in Bloom", New York, United States
 2002: "Quand passent les chevaux", Galerie Monnin, Pétion-Ville, Haiti
 2001: Ethno Galerie, Pétion-Ville, Haiti
 2000: "Héritage de Couleurs", Ethno Galerie, Pétion-Ville, Haiti
 2000: "Trio - Sergine Andre, Barbara Cardone, Pascale Monnin, Galerie Monnin, Pétion-Ville, Haiti
 2000: "Haïti: Anges and Démons", Halle Saint Pierre, Paris, France
 1998: Paginkob association, Brussels, Belgium
 1997: "Les femmes peintres d'Haïti", Musée du Panthéon National Haïtien, Port-au-Prince, Haiti
 1996: "L'invisible", Sergine Andre and Pascale Monnin, Galerie Monnin, Pétion-Ville, Haiti

Prizes and awards 
 2006: Guest Artist, Bag Factory, Johannesburg, South Africa
 1998: Guest Artist, École nationale supérieure des Beaux-Arts, Paris, France
 1997: Grand Prize of the Institut français, "Connaître les jeunes peintres"

Videos 
 Sergine André, entre chaos et cosmos, Portrait/Interview with Sergine Andre, Haiti Inter, 2022
 'Intranquillement Votre', Interview with Sergine Andre 08 Sergine 02 James Noel / Maksaens Denis, 2016
 Ayiti directed by Laurence Magloire
 France 2: Culture Monde
 France 3: 'Haiti, Royaume de ce Monde' Haïti, Royaume de ce monde, une exposition à la Fondation Agnès B

Publications 
 Artist's Monograph  Dialogue in One Voice (Dialogue a une Voix), Sergine Andre, CIDIHCA Editions, Montreal, 2022
 Cover illustrations for 'Douwan Deye' (2022), 'Miwo Miaba' (2022), 'Nulles Veines N'est Fumante' (2022), 'Il n'est le Solitude que l'ille Lointaine' (2020), 'Powem Entedi ak lot Powem' (2020), ' La Critique Litairaire, Legs et Literature #10' (2017), all Ed. Legs Editions, Delmas, Haiti
 Art review "IntranQu'illites" 5th edition on Eros (as Artistic Director), Ed. Passagers des Ventes, Paris, France. 2020
 Thomas C. Spear, 'Lettre à Sergine', in "Le Serpent à plumes pour Haïti", Ed. Le Serpent à Plumes, Paris, France, 2010
 "Haïti:avant l'orage", Frankettiene and Olivier Beytout, Éditions Riveneuve, Paris, France, 2010.
 "Saisir l’âme de Haïti : Sergine André", Le Courrier ACP-EU, Brussels, January/February 2008
 "Sergine André et l'Atelier Eko", Dieuvela Etienne, Le Nouvelliste, Haïti, 2003
 "L'Art de Sergine André", Jobnel Pierre
 "Sergine André au-delà des sens", Gary Victor, Le Matin, Haïti
 "Haïti anges et démons", Ed. Hoëbeke / La Halle Saint Pierre, Paris, 2000
 "Carnets de Voyage II", Titouan Lamazou (fr), Ed. Gallimard, Paris, 2000,
 Cover illustrations of works by Gary Victor: "A l'Angle des Rues Parallèles" (2003) et "Le Diable dans une Tasse de Thé à la Citronelle" (2005). Ed. Vents d'ailleur, France
 Connaître les jeunes peintres, 1997

References

External links 
 
 acp-eucourier.info
 aleriemonnin.com
 cyberpresse.ca

1969 births
Living people
Haitian women painters
20th-century Haitian painters
20th-century women artists
21st-century painters
21st-century women artists
Haitian expatriates in Belgium
People from Artibonite (department)